In enzymology, a 4-deoxy-L-threo-5-hexosulose-uronate ketol-isomerase is an enzyme that catalyzes the chemical reaction

4-deoxy-L-threo-5-hexosulose uronate  3-deoxy-D-glycero-2,5-hexodiulosonate

Hence, this enzyme has one substrate, 4-deoxy-L-threo-5-hexosulose uronate, and one product, 3-deoxy-D-glycero-2,5-hexodiulosonate.

This enzyme belongs to the family of isomerases, specifically those intramolecular oxidoreductases interconverting aldoses and ketoses.  The systematic name of this enzyme class is 4-deoxy-L-threo-5-hexosulose-uronate aldose-ketose-isomerase. This enzyme is also called 4-deoxy-L-threo-5-hexulose uronate isomerase.  This enzyme participates in pentose and glucuronate interconversions.

Structural studies

References

 

EC 5.3.1
Enzymes of known structure